40 y 20 is a Mexican comedy television series produced by Gustavo Loza for Blim. The first season was released on April 1, 2016.  The series stars Jorge van Rankin, Mauricio Garza, Michelle Rodríguez, Mónica Huarte and Verónica Jaspeado. The series has been renewed for a ninth and tenth season. The ninth season premiered on October 11, 2022.

Synopsis 
Paco and Fran, divorced father and teenage son respectively, will live all kinds of entanglements and nonsense within the typical coexistence of a family divorced, dysfunctional and fun. Both men will have to deal with their conquests as they face the crisis of the forties, adolescence and a former woman and mother who continues to resent each step of both.

Cast

Main 
 Jorge van Rankin as Paco: the typical manchild who wants to remain young despite being over 40, that is why he is attracted to beautiful 20-year-olds. He is Fran's father.
 Mauricio Garza as Fran: the son of Paco and Rocío, a college boy and twenty-year-old who likes to sleep with older women.
 Michelle Rodríguez as Toña: the maid of Paco, who is more like part of the family.
 Mónica Huarte as Rocío: mother of Fran and ex-wife of Paco, who, although she denies it, still keeps many romantic feelings for him. (main, seasons 1–2, 5–; guest seasons 3–4)
 Verónica Jaspeado as Rosario (seasons 3–4): she is in charge of administration of the building where Paco lives. She is also Fran's aunt and Rocío's sister
 Oswaldo Zárate as Borrego (season 8; recurring seasons 1–7)
 Armando Hernández as Brayan Dannielle (season 9; recurring seasons 1–8)
 Bruno Loza as Lucas (season 9)

Recurring 
 Begoña Narváez as Miranda
 Jessica Mas as Lola
 Luis Gatica as Víctor
 Pascacio López as Jair Gabriel
 Natalia Téllez as Montserrat
 Estefanía Ahumada Lama as Macarena
 Natalia Varela as Marijo
 Sophie Alexander as Laura
 Coral Bonelli as Coral
 Itahisa Machado as Karime
 Regina Rojas as Emilia
 Mariana Carvajal as Susana
 Gerardo Taracena as Macedonio
 Nashla Aguilar as Mary
 Katia Bada as Simone

Episodes

Awards and nominations

References

External links 
 

Mexican television sitcoms
2016 Mexican television series debuts
Las Estrellas original programming
Blim TV original programming
Television series by Televisa
Spanish-language television shows
2010s Mexican comedy television series
2020s Mexican comedy television series